Dave Yaccarino is a Republican member of the Connecticut House of Representatives.  He was first elected to the legislature in 2010, and  represents the 87th district. Yaccarino lives in North Haven, Connecticut.

Education and personal life
Yaccarino has an associate degree in Liberal Sciences from Gateway Community College where he is inducted into the Hall of Fame and taught a U.S. History course. He is a former supply technician in the U.S. Navy Reserve. Since 1991, Yaccarino has owned DJ's Sports Collectible and Comics in North Haven. He has three children.

Political career
Yaccarino was elected to the Connecticut House of Representatives in 2010. He was reelected without an opponent in 2012. In 2014, he defeated Democrat Alden Mead for the seat. In 2016, Yaccarino's name was not included on the ballot as a Republican, after he failed to sign nominating paperwork. A Superior Court judge ordered that it be included on the ballot.

In the 2015 session, Yaccarino was one of thirteen Assistant Minority Leaders. He is currently the ranking Republican on the House Veterans Affairs committee. He is also a member of the Finance, Revenue and Bonding, Public Safety and Security, and Energy and Technology Committees.

Yaccarino is a member of the North Haven Republican Town Committee.

Political views

Education
Yaccarino was one of fifteen co-sponsors of HB 7102, introduced by Democratic leadership, which changed the funding formula for twenty-five school building projects across the state. The bill passed the legislature unanimously.

Gun control
In 2013, Yaccarino voted in favor of rifle weapon legislation in the wake of the Sandy Hook Elementary school massacre.  He has an A rating in the National Rifle Association.

References

External links
Project Vote Smart bio
Connecticut House of Representatives
Connecticut House Districts Map

Living people
Republican Party members of the Connecticut House of Representatives
21st-century American politicians
1958 births
Politicians from New Haven, Connecticut
People from North Haven, Connecticut